Ronnie Hopkins (born March 9, 1962) is an American former professional stock car racing driver. He has raced in the NASCAR Winston Cup Series and the NASCAR Budweiser Late Model Sportsman Series.

Motorsports career results

NASCAR
(key) (Bold – Pole position awarded by qualifying time. Italics – Pole position earned by points standings or practice time. * – Most laps led.)

Winston Cup Series

Budweiser Late Model Sportsman Series

References

External links
 

1962 births
NASCAR drivers
Living people
Sportspeople from Greenville, South Carolina
Racing drivers from South Carolina